Matías Jesús Almeyda (born 21 December 1973) is an Argentine professional football manager and former player who is the current manager of Greek Super League club AEK Athens.

Nicknamed El Pelado ("bald one") despite his traditionally long hair, he spent most of his career at River Plate and in Italy, representing four teams in the latter country.

Almeyda represented Argentina, appearing with the national team in two World Cups. After retiring in 2011, he went on to manage River Plate, Banfield, Guadalajara and the San Jose Earthquakes.

Playing career

Club
Born in Azul, Buenos Aires Province, Almeyda started playing professionally for local and national powerhouse Club Atlético River Plate, first as understudy to Leonardo Astrada then as a starter, helping the side to the 1996 Primera División title after his insertion in the starting XI, as well as that year's Copa Libertadores. Shortly after, he moved to Sevilla FC in Spain for a record fee for a player in the country of $9 million; he appeared regularly in his first and only season with the Andalusians, but suffered La Liga relegation.

Almeyda played in the Italian Serie A in the following eight years, successively representing S.S. Lazio, A.C. Parma and Inter Milan. He spent three seasons in Rome with Lazio, becoming a firm fan favourite especially after scoring a 35-yard goal against Parma's Gianluigi Buffon, his only of the 1999–2000 campaign, which ended with league and Coppa Italia conquest. Additionally, he was voted the competition's best player in 1998–99, and also won – as a starter – the last UEFA Cup Winners' Cup, against RCD Mallorca, and was often partnered with compatriot Juan Sebastián Verón in the heart of midfield by manager Sven-Göran Eriksson in his 4–4–2 formation, with Verón providing the creativity and Almeyda the strength.

In the summer of 2002, Almeyda was exchanged with Vratislav Greško and moved to Inter, where he was again partnered by compatriots as in his previous clubs. Two years later he joined his final team in Italy, lowly Brescia Calcio, on a free transfer. The following year, after the team's relegation as second from bottom, he returned to Argentina and agreed to play for Quilmes Atlético Club, which appeared at the Libertadores, announcing his retirement after their elimination from that tournament.

After one and a half years away from football, in which he represented Argentina in a Showball tour around the world alongside Diego Maradona and participated in the Indoor Football World Cup in Spain, Almeyda joined Norwegian Premier League side FK Lyn in Oslo, in which he was accompanied by compatriot José Oscar Flores; their friend Terje Liverod was central in these transfers. The midfielder made his debut on 13 May 2007, but only played regularly in the reserves and in the domestic cup, being released as the striker shortly after and again retiring from football.

On 16 January 2009, at almost 36, Almeyda, after nearly agreeing on a return to River, signed with modest Club Atlético Fénix in the fourth division. During his brief spell, he managed to be sent off on two occasions.

On 19 August 2009, veteran Almeyda finally re-joined his main club River Plate, teaming up with former teammates Marcelo Gallardo and Ariel Ortega. In June 2011, the team was relegated to the second level for the first time in their history and he retired from football, being appointed team manager the following month.

International
Almeyda won 35 caps for Argentina over the course of seven years, his debut coming in April 1996 against Bolivia. Shortly after, he helped the Olympic side to the silver medal at the Summer Olympics in Atlanta.

Subsequently, Almeyda was picked in the squad for the 1998 FIFA World Cup in France. He started in all five games during the tournament, as the country reached the quarter–finals.

After Marcelo Bielsa became Argentina's manager, Almeyda did not get as much playing time. He was, however, selected for the 2002 World Cup which was held in South Korea and Japan, and played in the 1–1 group stage draw against Sweden.

Managerial career

River Plate
Almeyda spent 18 months in charge at River Plate, winning the Primera B Nacional and earning promotion back to the top division at the end of the 2011–12 season. He left the club in November 2012.

Banfield
In early April 2013, Almeyda signed with Club Atlético Banfield in the Argentine second level. During his spell, he won the league title once again to be subsequently promoted.

Guadalajara
On 15 September 2015, Almeyda was appointed manager at C.D. Guadalajara of the Mexican Liga MX, proclaiming he wanted to "awaken the giant." He won his first four matches in charge, including one against rivals Club América on 26 September by a score of 2–1 at the Estadio Azteca.

On 4 November 2015, after nine years of a title hiatus, Almeyda's team won the Copa MX after defeating Club León by a score of 1–0. On 10 July 2016, they played their first ever Supercopa MX and won their second trophy in under a year by besting C.D. Veracruz 2–0, and as a result qualified to the Libertadores for the first time since 2012, but ultimately did not participate as a result of scheduling conflicts.

On 19 April 2017, Almeyda led Chivas to their fourth Copa MX title, defeating Monarcas Morelia in a penalty shootout after a 0–0 draw. After placing third overall in the Clausura's general table, the final second leg was played at the Estadio Chivas on 28 May 2017 and the hosts won their 12th title in the competition after besting Tigres UANL by an aggregate of 4–3; thus, they became the first team in Mexican history to win the double in a single season on two occasions.

Almeyda won the 2018 edition of the CONCACAF Champions League with the club, and as a result qualified for that year's FIFA Club World Cup. On 11 June 2018, however, he left, citing differences with an executive.

San Jose Earthquakes
On 8 October 2018, Almeyda was appointed as the new head coach of Major League Soccer club San Jose Earthquakes, starting with the 2019 season. He attained 44 points within the Western Conference, missing the playoff berth by one win.

The following campaign, Almeyda's side managed to reach the playoffs, facing Sporting Kansas City in the first round but losing following a 3–0 penalty shoot-out after a 3–3 tie.

On 18 April 2022, Almeyda and San Jose Eathquakes parted ways, two days after the team drew 2–2 with Nashville SC.

AEK Athens
On 20 May 2022, Almeyda signed a two-year contract with Greek Super League club AEK Athens. The contract includes a one-year renewal option, subject to performance satisfaction. On 10 January 2023, Almeyda renewed his contract with AEK until 2028.

Style of play
A tenacious, dynamic and physically strong player in spite of his diminutive stature, Almeyda excelled in a midfield holding role due to his stamina, tactical awareness, reactions, anticipation and work rate, as well as his ability to press opponents and break down opposition plays which allowed him to protect his team's back-line. Although he earned a reputation in the media as a hard tackler, he was gifted with good feet and passing ability, which enabled him to start attacking plays after winning back possession; he also stood out for his leadership throughout his career.

Career statistics

Club

International

Score and result list Argentina's goal tally first, score column indicates score after Almeyda goal.

Managerial statistics

Honours

Player
River Plate
Argentine Primera División: 1993 Apertura, 1994 Apertura, 1996 Apertura
Copa Libertadores: 1996 	

Lazio
Serie A: 1999–2000
Coppa Italia: 1997–98, 1999–2000	
Supercoppa Italiana: 1998
UEFA Cup Winners' Cup: 1998–99
UEFA Super Cup: 1999

Parma
Coppa Italia: 2001–02

Argentina
Summer Olympic Games Silver medal: 1996

Individual
Guerin d'Oro (former Serie A Footballer of the Year): 1998–99

Manager
River Plate
Primera B Nacional: 2011–12

Banfield
Primera B Nacional: 2013–14
	
Guadalajara
Liga MX: Clausura 2017
Copa MX: Apertura 2015, Clausura 2017
Supercopa MX: 2016
CONCACAF Champions League: 2018

Individual
Liga MX Best XI Manager: Clausura 2017
Liga MX Manager of the Season: 2016–17
CONCACAF Men's Football Coach of the Year: 2018

Notes

References

External links

  
 
 
 
 Liga MX coach profile 

1973 births
Living people
Sportspeople from Buenos Aires Province
Argentine footballers
Association football midfielders
Argentine Primera División players
Club Atlético River Plate footballers
Quilmes Atlético Club footballers
Club Atlético Fénix players
La Liga players
Sevilla FC players
Serie A players
S.S. Lazio players
Parma Calcio 1913 players
Inter Milan players
Brescia Calcio players
Eliteserien players
Lyn Fotball players
Argentina international footballers
1998 FIFA World Cup players
2002 FIFA World Cup players
Olympic footballers of Argentina
Footballers at the 1996 Summer Olympics
Medalists at the 1996 Summer Olympics
Olympic medalists in football
Olympic silver medalists for Argentina
Argentine expatriate footballers
Expatriate footballers in Spain
Expatriate footballers in Italy
Expatriate footballers in Norway
Argentine expatriate sportspeople in Spain
Argentine expatriate sportspeople in Italy
Argentine expatriate sportspeople in Norway
Argentine football managers
Argentine Primera División managers
Club Atlético River Plate managers
Club Atlético Banfield managers
Liga MX managers
C.D. Guadalajara managers
Major League Soccer coaches
San Jose Earthquakes coaches
Argentine expatriate football managers
Expatriate football managers in Mexico
Expatriate soccer managers in the United States
Argentine expatriate sportspeople in Mexico
Argentine expatriate sportspeople in the United States